The Diponegoro class of guided-missile corvettes of the Indonesian Navy are SIGMA 9113 types of the Netherlands-designed Sigma family of modular naval vessels, named after Indonesian Prince Diponegoro. Currently there are four Diponegoro-class corvette in service.

History 
The Indonesian variant is based on the Sigma 9113 design. Work on the first of the class, KRI Diponegoro, began with the first steel cutting conducted in October 2004. The ship was christened on 16 September 2006 and commissioned on 2 July 2007 by Admiral Slamet Soebijanto, Indonesian Navy Chief of Staff.

Options for two other units were exercised in January 2006 with the first steel cut commenced on 3 April 2006 in Damen's Schelde Naval Shipbuilding yard, Vlissingen-Oost yard and not in Surabaya stated earlier.

On 28 August 2007, Jane's Missiles and Rockets reported that Indonesia was having problems securing the export license for the MM-40 Exocet block II and are considering Chinese made C-802 anti-ship missiles as alternatives. However, the ships have already been delivered with the Exocet missiles. In 2019 MM40 Exocet Block III were launched from KRI Sultan Iskandar Muda (367).

Modernisation
In early November 2022, PT Len and Thales Nederland has signed a contract to undertake the refurbishment of the integrated mission systems for all four Diponegoro-class ships. These ships will soon be refurbished with an Integrated Missions System including the TACTICOS Baseline 2 Combat Management System, the Naval Smarter (NS) 50 radar, as well as the latest in software-driven radar technology able to combat the highest level of threats.

Ships of class 
Indonesian Navy / Sigma 9113 design

References

 
Corvette classes
Corvettes of the Indonesian Navy